Michael McMillian (born October 21, 1978) is an American actor and writer, known for his roles as Henry Gibson on What I Like About You, Steve Newlin on the HBO series True Blood, Owen on Hot in Cleveland and Tim in Crazy Ex-Girlfriend. McMillian is also the creator and writer of a comic book, Lucid.

Early years
McMillian was born in Colorado Springs, Colorado, and grew up in Olathe, Kansas, attending Blue Valley Northwest High School through his second year. In 1995, McMillian transferred to Interlochen Arts Academy, where he studied acting, playwriting and screenwriting. He attended Carnegie Mellon University, where he was signed by an agent after a senior class showcase.

Career

McMillian has acted in films and television shows and has contributed voice work to a number of video games. He garnered attention for his starring role in the independent film Dorian Blues, playing a young man struggling with his family's reaction to his coming out. He played Greg in the original pilot episode of Luis, but gave up the series in favor of making his then-recurring What I Like About You character, Henry Gibson, a regular. McMillian penned an episode during the third season of What I Like About You. He played the role of Harper in the TNT's Saved. His most recent film role was in Imagine That.

In 2009, McMillian wrote and created the magic-themed comic book mini-series, Lucid, for Before the Door Pictures and Archaia Studios Press. He is also co-writer of the second True Blood comic book series produced by IDW publishing and HBO. In 2010, he appeared opposite star Hilary Duff in the TV movie Beauty & the Briefcase, based on the novel Diary of a Working Girl by Daniella Brodsky.

Filmography

Film

Television

References

External links
 

1978 births
Living people
Writers from Colorado Springs, Colorado
Male actors from Kansas
American male film actors
American male television actors
Carnegie Mellon University College of Fine Arts alumni
Male actors from Greater Los Angeles
People from Olathe, Kansas
Male actors from Colorado Springs, Colorado
21st-century American male actors